Nicușor Vlad (born 12 June 1960) is a Romanian former footballer who played as a central defender.

Honours
FCM Galați
Divizia B: 1978–79
Dinamo București
Divizia A: 1981–82, 1982–83
Cupa României: 1981–82
Petrolul Ploiești
Divizia B: 1988–89

References

1960 births
Living people
Romanian footballers
Romania youth international footballers
Romania under-21 international footballers
Association football goalkeepers
Liga I players
Liga II players
FCM Dunărea Galați players
FC Dinamo București players
CS Corvinul Hunedoara players
Victoria București players
FC Rapid București players
FC Petrolul Ploiești players
Sportspeople from Galați